Nyang'oma Kogelo, also known as Kogelo, is a village in Siaya County, Kenya. It is located near the equator, 60 kilometres (37 mi) west-northwest of Kisumu, the former Nyanza provincial capital. The population of Nyangoma-Kogelo is 3,648.

Services 

Nyang'oma Kogelo is a typical rural Kenyan village with most residents relying on small-scale farming as their main source of income. The village has a commercial centre with various shops and a bar offering shopping and recreation to the populace. The villagers practice different religions and coexist peacefully. Nevertheless, in 2009, the Nyang'oma Seventh-day Adventist Church was involved in the attempted conversion of Barack Obama's step-grandmother Sarah Obama to Christianity. Following counsel from her family, she opted out of the arranged public conversion and baptism and remained a Muslim. 

The village has a primary school (Senator Obama Primary School) and a high school (Senator Obama Secondary School). The land for both schools was donated by Barack Obama Sr., a native of the village, and they were renamed in 2006 after his son Barack — then a United States senator. There is also a health centre. 

Prior to the 2008 US presidential election, the village had no electricity, but was connected to the national grid immediately following Obama's victory, owing to the consequent rise in interest in the village. The village also saw its first Kenya Police post set up in the wake of the election outcome.

Transport 

The village is along the unpaved C28 road between Ng'iya and Ndori junctions. Less than 10 kilometres north of Kogelo, Ngiya is located along the Kisumu - Siaya road (C30 road). Few kilometres south of Nyang'oma Kogelo, a bridge built in 1930 crosses the Yala River flowing to Lake Victoria, before the road reaches Ndori along the Kisumu - Bondo road (C27 road).  Kogelo is a road distance of  882 kilometres (548 miles) west of Mombasa.

Administration 

Nyang'oma Kogelo is part of South East Alego electoral ward of Siaya County Council and Alego Constituency. Following the 2007 civic elections, the local councillor is Julius Okeyo Omedo of Orange Democratic Movement. South East Alego is also an administrative location in the Karemo division of Siaya district. The location has a population of 17,294. As of 2008, the chief of the location is James Ojwang' Obalo, whose office is located next to the Nyang'oma Kogelo shopping centre.

History 
Nyang'oma Kogelo is the home of the immigrant ancestors of the family of Barack Obama, the 44th president of the United States. They have resided in the village since colonial times.

Obama fame 

Since 2006, the village has received international attention because it is the hometown of Barack Obama Sr. (d. 1982), the father of former United States President Barack Obama. Barack Obama Sr. is buried in the village. Some of their family members still live in the village. His paternal step-grandmother Sarah Onyango Obama lived there until her death in March 2021.

Because of its connection with the former American president, the village is expected to be visited by many tourists from the US and other countries. The Kenyan government is promoting it as a tourist attraction of western Kenya. An Obama-themed museum was to be built by the Kenyan government and opened in the village in 2009. A Nairobi-based cultural organisation will build the Dero Kogelo Library and Cultural Centre in the village.

Obama visited the village in July 2018.

References

External links 
www.kogelo.co.ke

Siaya County
Populated places in Nyanza Province